Jirsar-e Vishka (also Romanized as Jīrsar-e Vīshkā; also known as Jīrsar-e Vīshkāh) is a village in Nowsher-e Koshk-e Bijar Rural District, Khoshk-e Bijar District, Rasht County, Gilan Province, Iran. At the 2006 census, its population was 566, in 161 families.

References 

Populated places in Rasht County